John Till (December 28, 1945 – September 4, 2022) was a Canadian musician.  He was noted for co-founding The Revols, as well as heading Full Tilt Boogie Band, which was Janis Joplin's backup band.

Early life 
Till was born in Stratford, Ontario, on December 28, 1945. His parents were both musicians who had a Dixieland band.  His father played guitar, tenor banjo, and double bass; his mother played both classical music and ragtime on the piano. Till attended Stratford Central High School, where he met his future bandmates Richard Manuel and Ken Kalmusky.

Career 
In 1957, when Till was around twelve years old, he established The Revols with Kalmusky on bass, Doug "Bo" Rhodes on vocals, and Jim Winkler on drums. Manuel later joined on piano and vocals. They were eventually taken under the wing of Ronnie Hawkins. Till played in local bands until the early 1960s, when he was picked to play in Hawkins's band The Hawks, to replace previous members who had left to tour with Bob Dylan (see The Band). After touring with Hawkins, the members of this band moved to New York City to try to establish themselves as musicians in the larger US market, where Till became a studio musician and was doing commercial sessions and led his group, the Full Tillt Boogie Band ("Tillt" spelled with two l's to allude to Till's last name).

Till and others from Full Tillt were hired in 1969 as touring musicians for Janis Joplin's Kozmic Blues Band, along with Full Tillt bass player Brad Campbell on her Full Tillt Boogie Band, as a side project with Till's fellow Canadian band members. However, Joplin was not happy touring with some of the group members, feeling some of them to be too "square". Joplin and her management subsequently hired Till, bass player Brad Campbell, and pianist Ken Pearson (from nearby Woodstock, Ontario), to fill out her new band, now called Full Tilt Boogie. The band appeared on The Dick Cavett Show and was booked on the Festival Express which toured across Canada. The group recorded their classic Pearl album, which reached the No. 1 spot on the Billboard charts in February 1971, after Joplin's death.

After Joplin's death, and the subsequent breakup of Full Tilt Boogie, Till played with Bobby Charles, Bob Burchill, and his ensemble in the Stratford apartments. He later moved back to Stratford, Ontario, retiring from the music industry and raising his family there. In the foreword of Love, Janis (1992), Laura Joplin's biography of her relationship with her famous sister, Till, and his wife are thanked for providing some of the material for the book.

In November 2020, Till and Kalmusky – deceased by then – were awarded Bronze Stars from the city of Stratford for "significant contributions to the cultural or social fabric of Stratford on a national or international scale."

Personal life 
Till was married to Dorcas until his death.  Together, they had two children: Michael and Shawn. He worked as a computer technician at an engineering firm in his hometown during his later years.

Till died on September 4, 2022, at his home in Stratford, Ontario.

Explanatory notes

References

External links 
 Ronnie Hawkins: history of The Hawks
 Janis Joplin bio
 
 

1945 births
2022 deaths
Canadian male guitarists
Canadian rock guitarists
Canadian session musicians
Full Tilt Boogie Band members
Sportspeople from Stratford, Ontario